Barilius bendelisis is a fish in genus Barilius of the family Cyprinidae. It is found in Pakistan, India, Nepal, Bangladesh, Sri Lanka, Bhutan and Myanmar.

References 

Barilius
Fish of Bangladesh
Fish of India
Fish of Pakistan
Freshwater fish of Sri Lanka
Fish described in 1807